Audio Analogue is a manufacturer of home audio equipment based in Monsummano Terme, PT, Italy. Established in 1995, they sell a wide range of CD players, amplifiers, and tuners. One of its most popular and well-reviewed products is its Puccini amplifier.

See also

 List of Italian Companies

References

External links
 Official Web site (English)
 Unofficial Web site (English)

Audio equipment manufacturers of Italy
Italian companies established in 1995
Italian brands